The Chiles Academy is a public charter school located in 
Daytona Beach, Florida, United States. It is part of the Volusia County Schools district.

The school was originally built in 1926 as the Cypress Street Elementary School. Initially, the school consisted of a two-story block and stucco building with two brick wings. The school's name was changed in 1954 to Bonner Elementary School to honor its first and longest-serving principal, Evelyn Bonner, who headed the school from 1927 to 1959. Before her tenure at Cypress Street Elementary, Ms. Bonner taught at Campbell Elementary for 16 years. Following her retirement, Ms. Bonner continued to visit the school almost daily until her death in 1977 at the age of 85. Bonner Elementary School was one of several Volusia County schools closed in 2008. The building currently houses Chiles Academy, a charter high school for teen parents and their children.

On December 2, 1996, the school was added to the U.S. National Register of Historic Places. The property is part of the Daytona Beach Multiple Property Submission, a Multiple Property Submission to the National Register.

References

External links

 
 Cypress Street Elementary School at Florida's Office of Cultural and Historical Programs

Public high schools in Florida
National Register of Historic Places in Volusia County, Florida
Buildings and structures in Daytona Beach, Florida
Charter schools in Florida
School buildings completed in 1926